Hiram Foote Mather (February 13, 1796 Colchester, New London County, Connecticut - July 11, 1868 Chicago, Illinois) was an American lawyer and politician from New York.

Life
He was the son of Gibbons Mather (1760–1815) and Hannah (Foote) Mather (1766–1844). He graduated from Yale College in 1813. Then he studied theology at Andover Seminary, but abandoned this after two years, and studied law at Auburn, New York instead. He was admitted to the bar in 1819, and practiced in Elbridge, Onondaga County, New York.

On April 8, 1821, he married Sarah Anne Hyde (1800–1824), and they had two children. On November 26, 1831, he married Mary Parsons Cole (1806–1855), and they had eight children.

He was an Anti-Masonic member of the New York State Senate (7th D.) from 1829 to 1832, sitting in the 52nd, 53rd, 54th and 55th New York State Legislatures.

In 1844, he removed to Niles, Michigan, and in 1853 to Chicago. On October 15, 1857, he married Anna T. Norton.

He was buried at the Silverbrook Cemetery in Niles, MI.

Sources
The New York Civil List compiled by Franklin Benjamin Hough (pages 128f and 143; Weed, Parsons and Co., 1858)
Death of Hon. Hiram F. Mather in NYT on July 14, 1868
Obituary Record of Yale Graduates (who died 1867-68) (pg. 267) [gives wrong death date "July 12"]
Mather genealogy

External links

1796 births
1868 deaths
People from Colchester, Connecticut
Yale College alumni
People from Elbridge, New York
New York (state) state senators
Anti-Masonic Party politicians from New York (state)
19th-century American politicians
People from Niles, Michigan
Lawyers from Chicago
Andover Newton Theological School alumni
19th-century American lawyers